Nicholas Edward Burdi (born January 19, 1993) is an American professional baseball pitcher in the Chicago Cubs organization. He played college baseball for the Louisville Cardinals of the University of Louisville. He has previously played in Major League Baseball (MLB) for the Pittsburgh Pirates.

Amateur career
Burdi attended Downers Grove South High School in Downers Grove, Illinois, where he played for the school's baseball team as a pitcher and for the football team as a quarterback. Before his senior year, Burdi quit the football team to focus on baseball. Burdi, as a child and teen also played for the Downers Grove Longshots.

Burdi participated in the Area Code Games in the summer of 2010, attracting the attention of scouts, including Keith Law of ESPN.com. After his senior season, Burdi expected to be chosen between the third to fifth rounds of the 2011 Major League Baseball (MLB) Draft. However, he lasted in the draft until the 24th round, when he was selected by the Minnesota Twins, with the 748th overall pick. He did not sign with the Twins and instead elected to attend college.

Burdi enrolled at the University of Louisville, to play college baseball for the Louisville Cardinals baseball team. After the 2012 season, he played collegiate summer baseball with the Chatham Anglers of the Cape Cod Baseball League. By his sophomore year, Burdi could reach  with his fastball. Pitching as the Cardinals' closer, Burdi has an 0.78 earned run average (ERA) and 61 strikeouts in  innings pitched through his sophomore year. After his sophomore year, he joined the United States national collegiate baseball team. As a junior, Burdi had a 0.49 ERA and 65 strikeouts in 37 innings.

Professional career

Minnesota Twins
Burdi was considered a top prospect in the 2014 MLB Draft. The Minnesota Twins selected Burdi in the second round with the 46th overall selection of the draft. He signed with the Twins on June 25, receiving a $1,218,800 signing bonus, and reported to the Cedar Rapids Kernels of the Class A Midwest League. He posted a 4.15 ERA in 13 innings, and the Twins promoted him to the Fort Myers Miracle of the Class A-Advanced Florida State League in August. Burdi opened the 2015 season with the Chattanooga Lookouts of the Class AA Southern League. He struggled with a 5.93 ERA, and was demoted to Fort Myers in late June. After spending six weeks with Fort Myers, the Twins promoted Burdi back to Chattanooga, where he finished the season with a 1.77 ERA in  innings. The Twins assigned him to the Scottsdale Scorpions of the Arizona Fall League after the regular season.

Burdi pitched only three innings in 2016 due to a bone bruise in his right elbow. Burdi began the 2017 season with Chattanooga. He required Tommy John surgery to repair a torn ulnar collateral ligament in his right elbow in May 2017.

Pittsburgh Pirates
After the season, the Philadelphia Phillies selected Burdi in the Rule 5 draft, and traded him to the Pittsburgh Pirates for $500,000 of international signing bonus money. On June 25, 2019, Burdi underwent thoracic outlet surgery to relieve symptoms of thoracic outlet syndrome, putting him out for the rest of the 2019 season. Burdi underwent Tommy John surgery in October 2020, and was designated for assignment on November 1, 2020. He elected free agency on November 9, after being outrighted.

San Diego Padres
On December 22, 2020, Burdi signed a minor league contract with the San Diego Padres. He did not play in a game in 2021 as he recovered from Tommy John surgery. He was assigned to the Triple-A El Paso Chihuahuas to begin the 2022 season, but was released on April 21, 2022, without making an appearance for the organization. He re-signed a minor league deal on May 4, 2022.

Chicago Cubs
After the 2022 season, the Chicago Cubs selected Burdi from the Padres in the minor league phase of the Rule 5 draft.

Personal life
Burdi's older brother, Drew, was an All-State quarterback who played football for Downers Grove South and Western Michigan. His younger brother, Zack, is also a professional baseball pitcher.

See also
Rule 5 draft results

References

External links

1993 births
Living people
All-American college baseball players
People from Downers Grove, Illinois
Baseball players from Illinois
Major League Baseball pitchers
Pittsburgh Pirates players
Louisville Cardinals baseball players
Chatham Anglers players
Cedar Rapids Kernels players
Chattanooga Lookouts players
Fort Myers Miracle players
Scottsdale Scorpions players
Bradenton Marauders players
Altoona Curve players
Indianapolis Indians players